Neomezia is a monotypic genus of flowering plants belonging to the family Primulaceae. It only contains one known species, Neomezia cubensis (Radlk.) Votsch 
It is also in the subfamily of Theophrastoideae.

It is native to Cuba.

The genus name of Neomezia is in honour of Carl Christian Mez (1866–1944), a German botanist and university professor. The Latin specific epithet of cubensis means "of Cuda" (where the plant was found).
Both the genus and species were first described and published in Bot. Jahrb. Syst. Vol.33 on page 506 in 1904.

It has an accepted subspecies, Neomezia cubensis subsp. oligospinosa  which is native to north-western Cuba.

References

Primulaceae
Primulaceae genera
Plants described in 1845
Flora of Guyana